The Ontario New Democratic Party Shadow Cabinet for the 40th Legislative Assembly of Ontario was announced on October 25, 2011.

See also
Executive Council of Ontario
Official Opposition Shadow Cabinet of the 40th Legislative Assembly of Ontario

Ontario New Democratic Party